Bajo la metralla (English: Under the shrapnel) is a 1983 Mexican thriller film directed by Felipe Cazals. It tells the story of a guerilla group that hides in a safe house with a hostage after a failed attack on a government official. The film is loosely based on the play The Just Assassins by Albert Camus.

The film received the 1984 Ariel Awards for Best Picture, Director, Best Actor for Humberto Zurita and Best Editing for Rafael Ceballos. It was also nominated for Best Supporting Actress (Beatriz Marín), Best Music and Best Set Design.

Plot
A guerrilla group commanded by Pedro (Humberto Zurita) tries to kidnap a senior government official but things go wrong and there are several casualties, including policemen and a guerrilla member. By chance, Pedro encounters Pablo (Manuel Ojeda), a former colleague, and the group decides to kidnap Pablo to prevent him from blowing the whistle.

Cast
 Humberto Zurita as Pedro / Mateo
 María Rojo as María
 José Carlos Ruiz as Martín
 Manuel Ojeda as Pablo
 Salvador Sánchez as Tomás
 Alejandro Camacho as Andrés
 Beatriz Marín as Marta
 Gerardo Vigil as Juan
 Aurora Alonso as Carlota Serrano de Durazo
 José Antonio Estrada as Col. José Ramírez

External links

References

1983 thriller films
1983 films
Best Picture Ariel Award winners
Mexican films based on plays
Films based on works by Albert Camus
Films directed by Felipe Cazals
Mexican thriller films
1980s Spanish-language films
1980s Mexican films